Hiroko Kuwata and Akiko Omae were the defending champions, but Omae chose not to participate. Kuwata played alongside Laura Robson, but they lost in the semifinals to Eri Hozumi and Miyu Kato.

Jacqueline Cako and Nina Stojanović won the title after defeating Hozumi and Kato 2–6, 7–5, [10–2] in the final.

Seeds

Draw

References
Main Draw

Suzhou Ladies Open - Doubles